Lâm Thao is a rural district of Phú Thọ province in the Northeast region of Vietnam. As of 2003 the district had a population of 106,610. The district covers an area of 115 km². The district capital lies at Lâm Thao.

Divisions
The district consists of two townships, Lâm Thao (also the district capital) and Hùng Sơn, and 12 communes: Xuân Huy, Thạch Sơn, Tiên Kiên, Sơn Vi, Hợp Hải, Kinh Kệ, Bản Nguyên, Vĩnh Lại, Tứ Xã, Sơn Dương, Xuân Lũng and Cao Xá.

References

Districts of Phú Thọ province